Julien Obioha (born July 7, 1994) is an American football defensive end who is currently a free agent. He played college football at Texas A&M, and signed with the New York Jets as an undrafted free agent in 2016.

Professional career
Obioha signed with the New York Jets on May 5, 2016 after going undrafted in the 2016 NFL Draft. On August 9, 2016, Obioha was waived/injured by the Jets and was placed on injured reserve. On April 26, 2017, Obioha was waived by the Jets. On August 23, 2017, Obioha hurt his back in a workout with the Saints.

References

External links
 Texas A&M Aggies bio

1994 births
Living people
American football defensive ends
Texas A&M Aggies football players
New York Jets players
Players of American football from New Orleans